Sleep of the Angels is the fifth full-length album by Greek extreme metal band Rotting Christ.
Like previous releases A Dead Poem and Triarchy of the Lost Lovers, the band refined their direction to a slower style with more emphasis on atmosphere and melodicism than brutality. Despite mixed critical consensus of the album, it would be supported during the band's first-ever tour in the United States.

Track listing
All songs written by Sakis Tolis. 
"Cold Colours" – 3:36
"After Dark I Feel" – 4:31
"Victoriatus" – 4:01
"Der Perfekte Traum" – 4:28
"You My Flesh" – 4:35
"The World Made End" – 3:00
"Sleep the Sleep of Angels" – 4:35
"Delusions" – 3:35
"Imaginary Zone" – 3:45
"Thine Is the Kingdom" – 5:00
"Moonlight [US Edition bonus track]" – 4:17

References

1999 albums
Rotting Christ albums